The Rollins-Eyre House, at 113 W. Main St. in Minersville, Utah, was listed on the National Register of Historic Places in 1995.	

It is a two-story house which was built in two phases, in c.1870 and c.1890, both of red brick construction.  The first phase was a Greek Revival-style central passage plan house;  the second added a Victorian Eclectic extension.

References

National Register of Historic Places in Beaver County, Utah
Greek Revival architecture in Utah
Victorian architecture in Utah
Houses completed in 1870